Willam F. Schlottmann (1825 - 1903) was a Civil War Confederate soldier in the 5th Regiment Texas Infantry, and also a member of the 12th Texas state legislature from 1870 to 1873.  As a representative in the Texas legislature, he was a member of the Federal Relations, Roads/Bridges and Ferries, and Public Debt committees. Schlottmann  migrated from Oppendorf, Westphalia, Prussia to Texas in the Fall of 1847 and arrived at Washington on the Brazos. He made his home in Brenham, Texas and married Elizabeth Richter on December 13, 1850. They had 5 daughters and 1 son. Schlottmann died on April 11, 1903, in Washington County and was buried at Salem Evangelical Lutheran Church Cemetery in  Brenham.

References 

Members of the Texas House of Representatives
1825 births
1903 deaths
Foreign Confederate military personnel
Confederate States Army soldiers
People from the Province of Westphalia
People from Brenham, Texas
19th-century American politicians